Michael Currie (born Herman Christian Schwenk Jr.; July 24, 1928 – December 22, 2009) was an American actor who appeared in several films and on television. Born in Kingston, New York to Herman C. Schwenk and Mabel Lockwood, he began his career in 1964.

He had roles in several Clint Eastwood movies including the comedy film Any Which Way You Can (1980) and Firefox (1982). He also played Lt. Donnelly in the fourth installment of the "Dirty Harry" film series Sudden Impact (1983), and reprised his role as Capt. Donnelly in the 1988 sequel The Dead Pool.

Currie had roles in the horror films Dead & Buried (1981) and Halloween III: Season of the Witch (1982). His other film appearances included Loving Couples (1980), Airplane II: The Sequel (1982), Starflight: The Plane That Couldn't Land (1983), The Philadelphia Experiment (1984), Distant Thunder (1988), The Man Without a Face (1993) and G.I. Jane (1997).

Currie starred in the 1960s television show Dark Shadows as Sheriff Jonas Carter. He has made guest appearances on many TV shows. Other television programs on which he appeared include Lou Grant, MASH, Barney Miller, Cheers, Homicide: Life on the Street and Law & Order. Currie died on December 22, 2009.

Filmography

References

External links

1928 births
2009 deaths
American male film actors
American male television actors
Male actors from New York (state)
20th-century American male actors